The NBR D Class (LNER Class J83) was a class of 0-6-0 tank locomotives designed by Matthew Holmes for short distance freight, station pilot, and heavy shunting duties on the North British Railway.

Service history
They were introduced in 1900 and had inside cylinders and piston valves operated by Stephenson valve gear. Forty of these new Class D engines were delivered in 1900–01, twenty each from Neilson and Company and Sharp, Stewart and Company. At grouping they became LNER class J83.

The class were highly successful in service, with only three failing to complete  during their lifetime. One locomotive, No. 9830, managed to complete .

The engines were commonly seen across the entire North British Railway network, and were the second largest class of tank engines on the railway, after the NBR A class.

Numbering
On the NBR they were numbered in a sequence commencing with 795 (and are sometimes referenced as 795 class engines). A total of 40 locomotives were built, all but one of which came into British Railways (BR) ownership at nationalisation in 1948. BR numbers were 68442–68481.

Withdrawal
One locomotive was withdrawn in 1947, a year before nationalisation, but later the class were gradually displaced by diesel shunters during the 1950s, with the last withdrawn in 1962. All members of the class were scrapped, and there is no surviving example in preservation.

Models

A (very basic) model has been produced by Hornby in OO gauge since the 1980s, but has since been relegated into their RailRoad range.

References

D
0-6-0T locomotives
Railway locomotives introduced in 1900
Standard gauge steam locomotives of Great Britain
Scrapped locomotives
Shunting locomotives